The UAE Handball League is the top professional handball league in the United Arab Emirates (UAE). The first team to win the title was Al-Sharjah. Al-Sharjah SCC has the record with 15 league titles to their name. Ten clubs compete in the League that operates on a system of 1 Level.

The League was founded in 1976 as the UAE Handball League. The first 1976–77 season was won by Al-Sharjah.

Member clubs (2020–21)

List of champions
Source:

1976–77: Al-Sharjah
1977–78: Al-Sharjah
1978–79: Al-Ain
1979–80: Al-Sharjah
1980–81: Al-Ain
1981–82: Al-Ain
1982–83: Al-Wasl
1983–84: Al-Wasl
1984–85: Al-Wasl
1985–86: Al-Ahli
1986–87: Al-Wasl
1987–88: Al-Ahli
1988–89: Al-Wasl
1989–90: Al-Shabab
1990–91: Not completed due to Gulf War
1991–92: Al-Sharjah
1992–93: Al-Sharjah
1993–94: Al-Ain
1994–95: Al-Sharjah
1995–96: Al-Ahli
1996–97: Al Jazira
1997–98: Al-Ahli
1998–99: Al-Sharjah
1999–2000: Al-Sharjah
2000–01: Al-Nasr
2001–02: Al-Sharjah
2002–03: Al-Nasr
2003–04: Al-Nasr
2004–05: Al-Ahli
2005–06: Al-Sharjah
2006–07: Al-Ahli
2007–08: Al-Nasr
2008–09: Al-Wasl
2009–10: Al-Wasl
2010–11: Al-Ahli
2011–12: Al-Ahli
2012–13: Al-Ahli
2013–14: Al-Nasr
2014–15: Al-Ahli
2015–16: Al Jazira
2016–17: Al-Sharjah
2017–18: Al-Sharjah
2018–19: Al-Sharjah
2019–20: Al-Sharjah
2020–21: Al-Sharjah

Champions

Performance by club

References

Handball in the United Arab Emirates
1976 establishments in the United Arab Emirates